Edwin Baruch Winans (May 16, 1826 – July 4, 1894) was a U.S. Representative from and the 22nd governor of Michigan.

Early life in New York and Michigan
Winans was born in Avon, New York, and moved with his parents, John and Eliza (née Way), to Michigan in 1834. The family first moved to Scio Township in Washtenaw County and in spring 1836 moved to Unadilla Township in Livingston County. His father died in the fall of 1843, and Winans moved with his mother to Hamburg Township, also in Livingston County. His mother died in July, 1852 and Winans worked for four years in a wool carding mill. At the age of twenty, he attended Albion College, Albion, Michigan, for two and a half years in preparation for entering the Law School of the University of Michigan at Ann Arbor.

California Gold Rush
Before completing his studies, Winans was drawn by news of the California Gold Rush, and in March 1850 left for California by an overland route to seek his fortune. Arriving July 20, he engaged in mining first on the north branch of the American River near Placerville. He continued the same work with some varied success in different parts of the state. In 1853, he was one of the members of the celebrated Randolph Hill Mining Company in the town of Rough and Ready (now a town west of Grass Valley in Nevada County).  In 1855, he returned to Michigan to marry Elizabeth Galloway and then returned to California, where he continued with the company until its dissolution in 1857. He was a principal stockholder in the Rough and Ready Ditch Company and also engaged in banking in Rough and Ready.

Politics in Michigan

He returned to Michigan in 1858 and purchased a 400-acre (1.6 km2) farm in Hamburg Township, Michigan, where he and his wife had two sons, Edwin, Jr. and George. He was twice elected a member of the Michigan State House of Representatives 1861–1865 and was a delegate to the state constitutional convention of May 15, 1867. He was a Hamburg Township supervisor, 1872–1873 and probate judge of Livingston County 1877–1881.

Winans was elected as a Fusion candidate and seated with the Democrats in the United States House of Representatives for the Forty-eighth and Forty-ninth Congresses, serving from March 4, 1883, to March 3, 1887. He resumed agricultural pursuits in Livingston County and served as Governor of Michigan 1891–1893. He was the first Democrat elected governor after the American Civil War (Josiah Begole had been elected in 1882 on a Fusionist ticket combining the Greenback and Democratic Parties). During his tenure, several election reform bills were sanctioned, the most significant of which was the secret Australian ballot. His son, George, acted as his private secretary.

Death and legacy
Winans died in Hamburg, Michigan at age 68, and is interred in Hamburg Cemetery.

Winans's son, also named Edwin Baruch Winans, was a major general in the United States Army and commanding general of the Third Army from September 15, 1932, to September 30, 1933. He also served as superintendent of the United States Military Academy at West Point, New York in 1927.

References

 The Political Graveyard
 Winans bio from Cyclopedia of Michigan: historical and biographical, comprising a synopsis of general history of the state, and biographical sketches of men who have, in their various spheres, contributed toward its development Published New York: Western Publishing and Engraving, 1900
 Winans bio from American biographical history of eminent and self-made men ... Michigan Volume. Published Cincinnati: Western Biographical Publishing Company, 1878.
 Winans biography from the public domain Portrait & Biographical Album of Ingham and Livingston Counties, Michigan, published Chicago: Chapman Bros., 1891
 Michigan historical marker for Winans
 National Governors Association

1826 births
1894 deaths
Democratic Party governors of Michigan
Democratic Party members of the Michigan House of Representatives
Albion College alumni
19th-century American Episcopalians
University of Michigan Law School alumni
Democratic Party members of the United States House of Representatives from Michigan
People from Avon, New York
Burials in Michigan
19th-century American politicians